Fair Play (formerly, Fairplay) is an unincorporated community in El Dorado County, California.

A post office was operated at Fair Play from 1860 to 1944.

References

Unincorporated communities in California
Unincorporated communities in El Dorado County, California